Czarface Meets Ghostface is a collaborative studio album by American hip hop supergroup Czarface and Wu-Tang Clan member Ghostface Killah. It was released on February 15, 2019 via Silver Age. The album features guest appearances from Kendra Morris.

Along with the singles, music videos were produced for: "Iron Claw", which was released on December 4, 2018, and "Mongolian Beef", which was dropped on February 12, 2019.

Track listing

Charts

References

External links

2019 albums
Czarface albums
Collaborative albums
7L & Esoteric albums
Inspectah Deck albums
Ghostface Killah albums